Brad Lynch (born 11 July 1997) was a professional Australian rules footballer who played for the Western Bulldogs in the Australian Football League (AFL). Lynch plays as a half-back, and has been compared to former Bulldogs captain Robert Murphy by defence coach Steven King because of his "kicking skills and lightning speed". 

Originally from Mandurah, Lynch originally played for Swan Districts in the West Australian Football League. He was drafted by the Bulldogs with pick 11 in the 2016 rookie draft, their first selection. In 2016, Lynch played 22 games for the Bulldogs' Victorian Football League side Footscray, including their premiership. He played only 11 games in 2017 after hamstring injuries. Lynch also signed a one-year contract extension, tying him to the Bulldogs until 2018. In 2018, Lynch made his debut in round 15 against Geelong at Docklands Stadium. He extended his contract by two years (to 2020) after playing the last nine games of the season. Sam Power, list manager for the Bulldogs, said "We clearly believe Brad has an exciting future in the game, and we’re delighted to see him commit for a further two seasons."

Lynch was delisted at the conclusion of the 2020 AFL season after playing just 9 games, all in the 2018 AFL season.

References

External links 

 
 

1997 births
Living people
Swan Districts Football Club players
Western Bulldogs players
Southport Australian Football Club players
Australian rules footballers from Western Australia
People from Mandurah